The Invasion, published in 1996 and written by K. A. Applegate, is the first book in the Animorphs series.  It is narrated by Jake.

Plot summary
Young teenagers Jake and Marco leave the mall one evening.  On the way out, they meet Rachel and Cassie, who are together, and Tobias—all children from their school—and decide to walk home together.  While taking a shortcut through an abandoned construction site, an alien spacecraft lands nearby. The badly injured alien pilot, an Andalite named Prince Elfangor, emerges from the ship and explains to the children that the Earth is being invaded in secret by a race of aliens called the Yeerks, a slug-like parasitic species who infest humans through their ear canals and take complete control of the human's body, turning them into what is called a Controller. The human controllers are still self-aware but the Yeerk in their head has complete control over their body and what they say. Elfangor tells them that the Andalite fleet has been defeated and more Andalites will not come to Earth for a year or more, and by then, Earth will already be completely taken over. To combat the Yeerks, he gives the humans morphing ability: the power to become any creature they touch by absorbing the creature's DNA. Elfangor warns them to never stay beyond two hours in a morph, or they will be trapped in that form forever. The Yeerks, led by Visser Three, arrive to kill Elfangor and eliminate all traces of him and his ship. The humans hide and watch, but are discovered and chased by the Yeerks. The group escapes shaken, but more or less unhurt.

The next morning, Tobias visits Jake and informs him that the previous night was not just a dream; he had already morphed into his pet cat. Jake is skeptical, but then acquires and morphs his dog Homer. The five kids meet at Cassie's farm, where a police officer arrives and informs them that a group of teenagers were sighted setting off fireworks in the abandoned construction site the previous night.  He asks if they know anything about it, and the five of them realize that the police officer is a Controller. Later that day, Jake's older brother Tom expresses a similar interest in the teenagers at the construction site and presses Jake for information. Marco realizes—much to Jake's anger—that Tom is also a Controller. Tom invites Jake and Marco to a meeting of a local community club called The Sharing, which the teens quickly determine is a front for the Yeerks to acquire new hosts. They also discover that their assistant principal Mr. Chapman is the leader of The Sharing and a human-Controller.

The next day, Jake morphs into a green anole lizard to spy on Chapman, and discovers that there is an entrance to the Yeerk Pool—a large, underground control center where the Yeerks can feed and recuperate—in their school.  The teenagers, newly christened as Animorphs ("animal morphers") by Marco, head to The Gardens, a large zoo and amusement park, to acquire some new, battle-capable morphs. That evening, they decide to infiltrate the Yeerk Pool in order to rescue Tom, but find that Cassie has been kidnapped by the policeman-Controller. With no time to plan a strategy, the four remaining Animorphs head into the Yeerk Pool.  They manage to rescue Cassie, but find themselves outnumbered and outgunned by Visser Three and his Yeerks. Jake, Rachel, Marco, and Cassie barely escape along with a woman who is free. During the escape, the policeman-Controller is killed. Tobias is able to escape later, but has stayed in morph too long and gets stuck in morph as a red-tailed hawk. The Animorphs fail to rescue Tom, and Jake promises to keep fighting the Yeerks until the Andalites arrive.

Inconsistencies
Jake uses thought-speak while in human form early on in the book, thinking at Tobias who is in cat morph, but in subsequent books it is stated that this is impossible. This is because K. A. Applegate changed her mind about this, but forgot to correct the scene. Later editions and the audio book corrected the mistake. 
When talking to Elfangor, Visser Three's dialogue gives the impression that the two have never met, but The Andalite Chronicles reveals that in reality, Elfangor was indirectly responsible for Visser Three acquiring his current host (although this implied lack of knowledge could have simply been Visser Three's attempts to taunt Elfangor with how little he has accomplished in his struggle against Visser Three).
When Tobias comes over to Jake's house, he said that when he morphed, his cat freaked out and scratched him, and he still had the scratches, even though morphing heals any injury. They discover this later when acquiring injured animals at the Wildlife Rehabilitation Clinic.

Morphs

TV adaptation
The Invasion was adapted as part of the Animorphs TV series, which aired on Nickelodeon and YTV. The first book in the series was covered by the first three episodes, "My Name is Jake" (Parts 1 & 2)", and "Underground". 

In the TV adaptation, Homer, Jake's golden retriever, is with the kids at the video arcade, and runs away from them while they are playing video games. The Animorphs chase the dog into the construction site, finding him standing next to Tobias. There, they see the lights from Prince Elfangor's landing fighter. In the book series, the Animorphs-to-be (minus Homer) meet up upon leaving the mall and together take an ill-advised shortcut through the construction site on their way home before seeing the lights of Elfangor's ship.
Elfangor brings the Escafil device with him as he steps out of his damaged fighter, rather than having Jake retrieve it as it happens in the book.
Jake's first morphing is the correct animal: his golden retriever, Homer. However, it occurs not in front of Tobias in Jake's room, but while he is hiding from the Controllers at the construction site, after witnessing the destruction of Elfangor's ship. Jake morphs Homer to escape the Controllers currently searching for him.
The Animorphs meet at Cassie's barn the day after their alien encounter, where they try out their morphing abilities. Tobias' first acquired morph is, incorrectly, the red-tailed hawk morph he would become trapped in (his first morph was his pet cat, Dude). Rachel's first morph is a cat, whereas in the book it is an elephant. Marco morphs a brown rat, Bitsy, an animal he never acquired in the books. Also, in this version, Tobias' hawk morph is a Harris hawk, not a red-tailed hawk.
In the TV series, both Marco and Jake morph into skinks, a type of lizard (though they actually morph into eastern fence lizards); in the book, only Jake morphs into a lizard, a green anole.
 In the TV series, Rachel's fighting morph is a lion, as opposed to the books' African Elephant.
 In the TV series, the Animorphs morph with their clothes, which is impossible in the book series.
 In the book, Tobias is the first to approach Elfangor and is the first to morph, convincing Jake and the rest, as opposed to the TV series, where he is the last in all of them.

Re-release
On May 1, 2011, Scholastic re-released The Invasion with a new lenticular cover that changes as the person holding it turns the book back and forth.

Graphic novel adaptation 
In October 2020, a graphic novel adaptation by Chris Grine was published by Graphix. Grine is currently contracted to adapt book 2, The Visitor, and book 3, The Encounter.

References

External links
 Official page at Scholastic.com
 The Invasion at OpenLibrary.org
 The Invasion on Amazon
 The Invasion on Indiebound
 The Invasion Description at Science Fiction Magazine
 Animorphs: The Invasion Begins on Rotten Tomatoes
 The Invasion on Powell's Books
 Review on KidsReads 
 Review on BookMooch

Animorphs books
1996 science fiction novels
1996 American novels
American young adult novels
2020 graphic novels
Science fiction graphic novels
Scholastic Corporation books